{{DISPLAYTITLE:Tau6 Serpentis}}

Tau6 Serpentis, Latinized from τ6 Serpentis, is a G-type giant star in the constellation of Serpens, approximately 450 light-years from the Earth.  It has an apparent visual magnitude of approximately 6.000, and is a member of the Ursa Major Stream.

References

G-type giants
Ursa Major Moving Group

Serpens (constellation)
Serpentis, Tau6
BD+16 2816
Serpentis, 19
140027
076810
5840